Thomas Winter may refer to:

Thomas Daniel Winter (1896–1951), U.S. Representative from Kansas
Thomas S. Winter, current editor-in-chief of Human Events
Thomas Winter (priest) (died 1615), Archdeacon of Derry and Cloyne
Thomas Wintour or Winter (1571–1606), English conspirator in a plot to assassinate James I of England
Thomas Wynter, also spelt Winter, illegitimate son of Cardinal Wolsey
Tom Winter (politician) (born 1986), American politician
Thomas Nelson Winter, classicist